Bommasandra is located at Bangalore in the state of Karnataka, India.

Demographics
 India census, Bommasandra had a population of 7 570. Males constitute 58% of the population and females 42%. Bommasandra has an average literacy rate of 72%, higher than the national average of 59.5%, with male literacy of 80% and female literacy of 61%. 15% of the population is under 6 years of age.

References

Neighbourhoods in Bangalore
Cities and towns in Bangalore Urban district